Tatsuta may refer to:

 Tatsuta, Aichi, a former village in Japan, merged into the city of Aisai in 2010
 , a pre-war Japanese ocean liner of the NYK Line
 , an unprotected cruiser in the early Imperial Japanese Navy
 , the second vessel of the Tenryū class of light cruisers in the Imperial Japanese Navy during World War II
 Tatsuta Shrine, a Shinto shrine located in Sangō, Nara in Japan

People with the surname Tatsuta include:
, Japanese voice actor
, Japanese football defender

Japanese-language surnames